Fennellomyces is a genus of fungi belonging to the family Syncephalastraceae.

Species:
 Fennellomyces gigacellularis 
 Fennellomyces heterothallicus 
 Fennellomyces linderi 
 Fennellomyces verticillatus

References

Fungi